Frank C. Matthews (Born July 13, 1972) is an African-American writer of urban fiction. His works are influenced by Iceberg Slim and Donald Goines.

Biography
Matthews grew up in Brooklyn and Queens, New York.

In September 2010, director F. Gary Gray (The Italian Job, Set It Off, Friday, Law Abiding Citizen) bought the TV and film rights to Respect The Jux.

Bibliography
Respect the Jux (2006)

References

External links 
 Simon and Schuster
 April Pohren, "Interview: Frank C. Matthews, Author of Respect the Jux", Blog Critics, January 9, 2011.
 "From down and out to selling 20,000 books: Interview with former inmate and author Frank C. Matthews", Literarily Speaking, January 14, 2011.
 AALBC Author
 Samson Styles, "The Power Of The Pen!", BET (Black Entertainment Television), October 27, 2010.

1972 births
Living people
21st-century American novelists
African-American novelists
American male novelists
Novelists from New York (state)
21st-century American male writers
21st-century African-American writers
20th-century African-American people
African-American male writers